The Silver Guardian is a Chinese web manhua created by Zero League and illustrated by Moon Cake. It was published by Tencent through their Tencent AC Web Comic service, compiling the series into 237 chapters. A Chinese-Japanese anime television series adaptation produced by Emon and directed by Masahiko Ōkura premiered on Tokyo MX on 1 April 2017. The series is licensed by Funimation. A second season premiered in January 2018.

Plot
The story follows a High school student and intense gamer Suigin Riku as he attends the prestigious Shinryou Private Academy, a school for the elite and the wealthy. However Suigin is anything but; in fact, he is very poor and has to work many part-time jobs just to pay for his tuition. One day while he is working a pool cleaning job one of his many jobs, he sees a cat drowning and without hesitation jumps in to save the kitty. To much surprise, it turns out he can't swim either and flails around drowning. Luckily a girl came by, by the name Rei Riku and saves him. He didn't know this but she was the daughter of the game developer that created his favorite game.

He also meets another girl a new friend he meets in Dungeon Century, his favorite online RPG. However, when it is announced that the game is scheduled to shut down he is heartbroken to know that his adventures with her are coming to a close. However, after the game is shut down he finds out that she and Rei Riku are the same person. Later he receives a new game to replace Dungeon Century—a tomb raiding game called Grave Buster. But when Rei is suddenly kidnapped, Suigin is pulled inside Grave Buster to save her.

Gin no Guardian follows Suigin as he fights through Grave Buster to save Rei, while uncovering his past.

Characters

Episode list

Season 1

Season 2

Reception
As of March 2016, the comic had been viewed over 418 million times.

Notes

References

External links
Official Comic website
Official Anime website 
The Silver Guardian on Crunchyroll

2017 anime television series debuts
2018 anime television series debuts
2017 Chinese television series debuts
Animated series based on comics
Chinese animated television series
Chinese webcomics
Crunchyroll anime
Funimation
Haoliners Animation League
Manhua adapted into television series
Manhua titles
Tencent manhua
Television shows based on manhua
Television shows based on webcomics
Tokyo MX original programming